An intimacy coordinator, sometimes called an intimacy director, is a member of a film or television crew who ensures the well-being of actors and actresses who participate in sex scenes or other intimate scenes in theater, film and television production. Intimacy coordinators work closely with directors, movement directors, and choreographers to help plan out intimate scenes with the actors and other crew members.

Function
According to Intimacy Directors International, a nonprofit organization founded in 2016 by Alicia Rodis, Tonia Sina, and Siobhan Richardson that advocates for the function, an intimacy coordinator is expected to ensure that:
all staff and actors are aware of the context of the intimacy as part of the story,
communication about the intimacy takes place among participants and avenues for reporting harassment are available,
actors continually consent to all scenes of intimacy,
all scenes of intimacy are performed according to a previously agreed-to choreography, and
actors are encouraged to mark the end of each intimate scene with a moment to signal the return to real-life interaction.

The role of intimacy coordinator is not to be confused with that of an "intimacy choreographer", who specializes in the techniques of staging intimate scenes.

History
Demand for the role grew in the U.S. entertainment industry after the 2017 Weinstein scandal and the Me Too movement highlighted the often routine nature of sexual harassment and misconduct in the industry. Actresses such as Emily Meade began to demand professional safeguards for their well-being on set, noting that given the structure of power in a production, actors (particularly young, inexperienced ones) might otherwise not feel able to speak up if directors, staff members or other actors disregarded their consent or previous agreements regarding intimate scenes. In 2017, the London talent agency Carey Dodd Associates fronted a campaign for an industry standard in handling scenes of intimacy using guidelines developed by Ita O'Brien. 

In October 2018, the television network HBO adopted a policy of using intimacy coordinators for all its series and films with intimate scenes. Intimacy coordinators and intimacy workshops teaching best practices for intimate scenes were also beginning to be used in London theaters as of 2018.

In January 2019, Netflix released Sex Education, its first production that used an intimacy coordinator, Ita O'Brien.

Further reading

References

Film and video terminology
Filmmaking occupations
Occupational safety and health
Sexuality in television
Theatrical occupations